"Multicoloured Angels" is a song by Dutch singer-songwriter Douwe Bob. The song was released in the Netherlands on 21 September 2012 as a digital download. The song was released as the lead single from his debut studio album Born In a Storm (2013). The song peaked to number 4 on the Dutch Singles Chart.

Track listing

Chart performance

Weekly charts

Release history

References

2012 debut singles
2012 songs
Douwe Bob songs